The New York City Council is the lawmaking body of New York City. It has 51 members from 51 council districts throughout the five boroughs.

The council serves as a check against the mayor in a mayor-council government model, the performance of city agencies land use decisions, and legislating on a variety of other issues. It also has sole responsibility for approving the city budget. Members elected in or after 2010 are limited to two consecutive four-year terms in office but may run again after a four-year respite; however, members elected before 2010 may seek third successive terms.

The head of the city council is called the speaker. The current speaker is Adrienne Adams, a Democrat from the 28th district in Queens. The speaker sets the agenda and presides at city council meetings, and all proposed legislation is submitted through the Speaker's Office. Majority Leader Keith Powers leads the chamber's Democratic majority. Minority Leader Joe Borelli leads the six Republican council members.

As of 2022, the council has 38 standing committees and 4 subcommittees, with oversight of various functions of the city government. Each council member sits on at least three standing, select or subcommittees (listed below). The standing committees meet at least once per month. The speaker of the council, the majority leader, and the minority leader are all ex officio members of every committee.

Council members are elected every four years. The exception is two consecutive two-year terms every twenty years to allow for redistricting after each national census (starting in 2001 and 2003 for the 2000 census and again in 2021 and 2023 for the 2020 census).

Composition

(An asterisk (*) next to the election year denotes a special election. A double asterisk (**) next to the election year means the member took office after certification to fill the remainder of an unexpired term.)

Salary
Council Members currently receive $148,500 a year in base salary, which the council increased from $112,500 in early 2016. Members receive no additional compensation for serving as a committee chairperson or other officer under the new salary raise.

Law

The New York City Charter is the fundamental law of the government of New York City including the council. The New York City Administrative Code is the codification of the laws promulgated by the council and is composed of 29 titles. The regulations promulgated by city agencies pursuant to law are contained in the Rules of the City of New York in 71 titles.

A local law has a status equivalent with a law enacted by the legislature (subject to certain exceptions and restrictions), and is superior to the older forms of municipal legislation such as ordinances, resolutions, rules and regulations. Each local government must designate a newspaper of notice to publish or describe its laws. The secretary of state is responsible for publishing local laws as a supplement to the Laws of New York (the "session laws" of the state), but they have not done so in recent years. The New York City Charter, the New York City Administrative Code, and the Rules of the City of New York are published online by the New York Legal Publishing Corp. under contract with the New York City Law Department.

History
The history of the New York City Council can be traced to Dutch Colonial times when New York City was known as New Amsterdam. On February 2, 1653, the town of New Amsterdam, founded on the southern tip of Manhattan Island in 1625, was incorporated as a city under a charter issued by the Dutch West India Company. A Council of Legislators sat as the local lawmaking body and as a court of inferior jurisdiction. During the 18th and 19th centuries the local legislature was called the Common Council and then the Board of Aldermen. In 1898 the amalgamation charter of the City of Greater New York renamed and revamped the council and added a New York City Board of Estimate with certain administrative and financial powers. After a number of changes through the ensuing years, the present Council was born in 1938 under a new charter which instituted the council as the sole legislative body and the New York City Board of Estimate as the chief administrative body. Certain functions of the council, however, remained subject to the approval of the board.

In 1938, a system of proportional representation known as single transferable vote was adopted; a fixed quota of 75,000 votes was set, so that the size of the council fluctuated with voter turnout. The term was extended to four years in 1945 to coincide with the term of the mayor. Proportional representation was abolished in 1947, largely from pressure from Democrats, who played on fears of Communist council members being elected (two already had). It was replaced by a system of electing one Council Member from each New York State Senate district within the city. The Charter also provided for the election of two Council Members-at-large from each of the five boroughs. In June 1983, however, a federal court ruled that the 10 at-large seats violated the United States Constitution's one-person, one-vote mandate.

In 1989, the Supreme Court ruled that the Board of Estimate also violated the one-person, one-vote mandate. In response, the new Charter abolished the Board of Estimate and provided for the redrawing of the council district lines to increase minority representation on the council. It also increased the number of Council Members from 35 to 51. The council was then granted full power over the municipal budget, as well as authority over zoning, land use and franchises. In 1993 the New York City Council voted to rename the position of president of the city council to the Public Advocate. As the presiding officer, the Public Advocate was an ex officio member of all committees in the council, and in that capacity had the right to introduce and co-sponsor legislation. However the city charter revision of 2002 transferred the duties of presiding officer from the Public Advocate to the Council Speaker; the Public Advocate remains a non-voting member of the council.

In 2022, the composition of first female majority City Council included the first Muslim woman, the first South Asian members, and the first openly gay Black woman.

Term limits
A two-term limit was imposed on city council members and citywide elected officials in a 1993 referendum. The movement to introduce term limits was led by Ronald Lauder, the heir to the Estée Lauder fortune. In 1996, voters turned down a council proposal to extend term limits. Lauder spent $4 million on the two referendums.

However, in 2008, under pressure from Mayor Michael Bloomberg (who, like many Council members, was facing the end of his two-term limit at that time), the council voted 29–22 to extend the limit to three terms; the council also defeated (by a vote of 22–28, with one abstention) a proposal to submit the issue to public referendum.

Legal challenges to the extension of term limits failed in federal court. The original decision by Judge Charles Sifton of the United States District Court for the Eastern District of New York (Long Island, Brooklyn, Queens and Staten Island) was upheld by a three-judge panel of the United States Court of Appeals for the Second Circuit (Vermont, Connecticut and New York), and a proposal in the New York State Legislature to override the extension was not passed.

Voters voted to reinstate the two-term limit law in another referendum in 2010. However, according to The New York Times, incumbent members of the city council who were elected prior to the 2010 referendum “will still be allowed to run for a third term. People in office before 2010 were eligible for three terms.”

Presiding officers since 1898
Through several changes in title and duties, this person has been, together with the Mayor and City Comptroller, one of the three municipal officers directly elected by all of the city's voters, and also the person who—when the elected mayor resigns, dies, or otherwise loses the ability to serve—becomes acting mayor until the next special or regular election.

Until 1989, these three officers, together with the five borough presidents, constituted the New York City Board of Estimate. Political campaigns have traditionally tried to balance their candidates for these three offices to appeal as wide a range of the city's political, geographical, social, ethnic and religious constituencies as possible (and, when possible, to both genders).

Notes
a. Became acting mayor upon the death or resignation of the elected mayor.
b. Later won election as mayor.
c. Unsuccessful candidate for mayor in a subsequent general election.
d. Not elected by citywide popular vote (Ardolph Kline had been elected deputy president by his fellow aldermen, and then succeeded as president upon Mitchel's resignation).

Standing committees

 Committee on Aging (Chair: Crystal Hudson)
 Subcommittee on Senior Centers and Food Insecurity (Chair: Darlene Mealy)
 Committee on Civil and Human Rights (Chair: Nantasha Williams)
 Committee on Civil Service and Labor (Chair: Carmen De La Rosa)
 Committee on Consumer and Worker Protection (Chair: Marjorie Velázquez)
 Committee on Contracts (Chair: Julie Won)
 Committee on Criminal Justice (Chair: Carlina Rivera)
 Committee on Cultural Affairs, Libraries & International Intergroup Relations (Chair: Chi Ossé)
 Committee on Economic Development (Chair: Amanda Farías)
 Committee on Education (Chair: Rita Joseph)
 Committee on Environmental Protection (Chair: James F. Gennaro)
 Committee on Finance (Chair: Justin Brannan)
 Committee on Fire & Emergency Management (Chair: Joann Ariola)
 Committee on General Welfare (Chair: Diana Ayala)
 Committee on Governmental Operations (Chair: Sandra Ung)
 Committee on Health (Chair: Lynn Schulman)
 Subcommittee on COVID Recovery and Resiliency (Chair: Francisco Moya)
 Committee on Higher Education (Chair: Eric Dinowitz)
 Committee on Hospitals (Chair: Mercedes Narcisse)
 Committee on Housing and Buildings (Chair: Pierina Sanchez)
 Committee on Immigration (Chair: Shahana Hanif)
 Committee on Land Use (Chair: Rafael Salamanca)
 Subcommittee on Landmarks, Public Sitings, and Dispositions (Chair: Farah Louis)
 Subcommittee on Zoning and Franchises (Chair: Kevin Riley)
 Committee on Mental Health, Disabilities, and Addictions (Chair: Linda Lee)
 Committee on Oversight and Investigations (Chair: Gale Brewer)
 Committee on Parks and Recreation (Chair: Shekar Krishnan)
 Committee on Public Housing (Chair: Alexa Avilés)
 Committee on Public Safety (Chair: Kamillah Hanks)
 Committee on Resiliency and Waterfronts (Chair: Ari Kagan)
 Committee on Rules, Privileges and Elections (Chair: Keith Powers)
 Committee on Sanitation and Solid Waste Management (Chair: Sandy Nurse)
 Committee on Small Business (Chair: Julie Menin)
 Committee on Standards and Ethics (Chair: Kalman Yeger)
 Committee on State and Federal Legislation (Chair: Shaun Abreu)
 Committee on Technology (Chair: Jennifer Gutiérrez)
 Committee on Transportation and Infrastructure (Chair: Selvena Brooks-Powers)
 Committee on Veterans (Chair: Robert F. Holden)
 Committee on Women and Gender Equity (Chair: Tiffany Cabán)
 Committee on Youth Services (Chair: Althea Stevens)
 Twin Parks Citywide Taskforce on Fire Prevention (Chair: Oswald Feliz)

Caucuses
 Black, Latino and Asian (BLA) Caucus
 Jewish Caucus
 LGBT Caucus
 Progressive Caucus
 Women's Caucus

See also
 Government of New York City
 Mayor of New York City
 New York City Civil Court
 New York City Criminal Court
 La Guardia and Wagner Archives

References

External links

 New York City Council main page
 La Guardia and Wagner Archives/The Council of the City of New York Collection 
 David W. Chen, Council Gets a Charge From Vote on Term Limits, New York Times, New York edition, October 25, 2008, page A18, retrieved the same day. (Discusses changes in the council's degree of independence and authority in relation to the mayor's powers.)
 NYS Go
 New York Forum
 Councilpedia, a Wiki about the city council (inactive since January 2013)
 New York City Charter, the New York City Administrative Code, and the Rules of the City of New York from the New York Legal Publishing Corp.

 
Citywide elected offices of New York City
New York (state) city councils
Government of New York City